The geology of the Cayman Islands includes carbonates deposited and periodically eroded over the last 30 million years. The underlying Cayman Ridge is proposed as an uplifted fault block. The oldest rocks are believed to be granodiorite, followed by a cap of basalt. Situated near the Oriente Transform Fault and the Mid-Cayman Rise, the islands are tectonically active. Older Miocene and Pliocene crystalline limestone is overlain by the Pleistocene Ironshore Formation  reef limestone and calcarenite.

References

Geography of the Cayman Islands
Natural history of the Cayman Islands
Cayman Islands
Cayman
Cayman Islands